Zubrnice is a municipality and village in Ústí nad Labem District in the Ústí nad Labem Region of the Czech Republic. It has about 200 inhabitants. The folk architecture in the village is well preserved and is protected by law as a village monument reservation.

Administrative parts

The village of Týniště is an administrative part of Zubrnice.

Etymology
The name is most likely derived from zubr (i.e. "european bison"). It first appeared as Zubrnycz.

Geography
It is located in the Central Bohemian Uplands.

History
The first written mention of Zubrnice is from 1352, when the church was mentioned. With a short break after the Hussite Wars, when Zubrnice was acquired by Jan of Vartenberk, the village was owned by the bishopric in Litoměřice continuously until 1848.

Sights
Zubrnice is known for it Museum in Nature with a set of valuable buildings of folk architecture, consisting of timbered, half-timbered and brick buildings. The baroque well in the centre is from 1695.

The Church of Saint Mary Magdalene is as old as the village. In 1723–1732, it was rebuilt in the Baroque style.

References

External links

The National Open Air Museum official website
Museum in Nature

Villages in Ústí nad Labem District